

324001–324100 

|-bgcolor=#f2f2f2
| colspan=4 align=center | 
|}

324101–324200 

|-bgcolor=#f2f2f2
| colspan=4 align=center | 
|}

324201–324300 

|-bgcolor=#f2f2f2
| colspan=4 align=center | 
|}

324301–324400 

|-bgcolor=#f2f2f2
| colspan=4 align=center | 
|}

324401–324500 

|-bgcolor=#f2f2f2
| colspan=4 align=center | 
|}

324501–324600 

|-bgcolor=#f2f2f2
| colspan=4 align=center | 
|}

324601–324700 

|-bgcolor=#f2f2f2
| colspan=4 align=center | 
|}

324701–324800 

|-id=787
| 324787 Wlodarczyk ||  || Ireneusz Wlodarczyk (born 1950) is a Polish astronomer at the Astronomical Observatory in Chorzow. Wlodarczyk specializes in the computation of orbits of asteroids and comets. He has written a number of popular books and 100 scientific papers. || 
|}

324801–324900 

|-bgcolor=#f2f2f2
| colspan=4 align=center | 
|}

324901–325000 

|-id=925
| 324925 Vivantdenon ||  || Dominique Vivant Baron Denon (1747–1825), a French artist, writer, diplomat, author, and archaeologist. || 
|}

References 

324001-325000